Ella O'Neill was an American screenwriter who penned B movies and serials at Universal in the 1930s. She worked primarily in the action, Western, and detective genres. She had been a practicing attorney in Chicago before she became a serial writer, and she was noted as a language expert.

Selected filmography 
Flaming Frontiers (1938)
The Phantom Rider (1936)
Flash Gordon (1936)
The Adventures of Frank Merriwell (1936)
Tailspin Tommy in The Great Air Mystery (1935)
The Roaring West (1935)
Rustlers of Red Dog (1935)
Tailspin Tommy (1934)
The Red Rider (1934)
The Vanishing Shadow (1934)
Pirate Treasure (1934)
The Perils of Pauline (1933)
Gordon of Ghost City (1933)
The Phantom of the Air (1933)
The Rustler's Roundup (1933)
Clancy of the Mounted (1933)
The Lost Special (1932)
Jungle Mystery (1932)
Heroes of the West (1932)
The Airmail Mystery (1932)
Detective Lloyd (1932)
Battling with Buffalo Bill (1931)
Danger Island (1931)
Heroes of the Flames (1931)
Finger Prints (1931)

References 

American screenwriters
American women screenwriters
Year of birth missing
Year of death missing